Liz Pichon (born 16 August 1963) is a British author and illustrator of children's books. She is best known for her Tom Gates series of "satirical realist comedy fiction", which has been translated into 46 languages and sold more than fourteen million copies worldwide.

Early life
Pichon was born on 16 August 1963 in London, England. She is the daughter of Francis and Joan Pichon. She received a BA in graphic design at the Camberwell School of Art. Her first job was as an art director for the music label Jive Records, a position she held between 1987 and 1990.

Her best-selling and multi-award-winning Tom Gates series was first published in 2011. There are currently 19 books in the Tom Gates series, as well as a special £1 book produced for World Book Day in 2013, a Tom Gates Annual, a Tom Gates Activity Book and a Tom Gates Music Book.

In 2016 Pichon created the "Kids' Tapestry", a children's version of the Bayeux Tapestry, featuring historical events to the mark the 950th anniversary of the Battle of Hastings.

In 2017 Pichon, Horsenden Primary School and her publisher, Scholastic Children's Books, broke the world record for the largest disco dance.

Shoe Wars, Pichon's new middle-grade title, was published in October 2020. 

A new television series based on the Tom Gates books is currently airing on Sky in 2021.

Personal life
Pichon is dyslexic, like her character Tom Gates. In 1990, she married Mark Flannery and they have three children: one son and two daughters. They currently live in Brighton.

Works

Outside of Tom Gates 

My Big Brother, Boris (Scholastic, 2004)
Bored Bill (Little Tiger, 2015)
Penguins (London: Gullane Children's Books, 2008)
The Three Horrid Pigs and the Big Friendly Wolf (Little Tiger, 2008); US title, The Three Horrid Little Pigs (Tiger Tales, 2008)
Shoe Wars (Scholastic UK, 2020)

As illustrator only (selected) 

 Twilight Rhymes Moonlight Verse, compiled by Mary Joslin (Oxford: Lion Children's Books, 1997)
 Spinderella, written by Julia Donaldson (Egmont UK, 2002)
 Beautiful Bananas, Elizabeth Laird (Oxford, 2003)
 The Three Billy Goats Fluff, Rachael Mortimer (Hodder Children's Books, 2010)
 Red Riding Hood and the Sweet Little Wolf, Rachael Mortimer (Hodder, 2012)

Tom Gates series 

 The Brilliant World of Tom Gates (2011) 
 Tom Gates: Excellent Excuses (And Other Good Stuff) (2011)
 Tom Gates: Everything's Amazing (Sort Of) (2011)
 Tom Gates: Genius Ideas (Mostly) (2012)
 Tom Gates Is Absolutely Fantastic (at Some Things) (2013)
 Tom Gates: Best Book Day Ever! (so far) (2013)
 Tom Gates: Extra Special Treats (not) (2013)
 Tom Gates: A Tiny Bit Lucky (2014)
 Tom Gates: Yes! No (Maybe... ) (2015)
 Tom Gates: Top of the Class (Nearly) (2015)
 Tom Gates: Super Good Skills (Almost...) (2016)
 Tom Gates: DogZombies Rule (For Now) (2016)
 Tom Gates: Family, Friends and Furry Creatures (2017)
 Tom Gates: Epic Adventure (kind of) (2017)
 Tom Gates: Totally Brilliant Annual (2017)
 Tom Gates: Biscuits, Bands and Very Big Plans (2018)
 Tom Gates: What Monster? (2018)
 Tom Gates: Mega Make and Do (and Stories Too!) (2019)
 Tom Gates: Spectacular School Trip (really!) (2019)
 Tom Gates: Ten Tremendous Tales (2021)
 Tom Gates: Random Acts Of Fun (2021)

Awards 

 1998 National Parenting Publications Award, Twilight Rhymes Moonlight Verse, poetry compiled by Mary Joslin and illustrated by Pichon, 1997
Roald Dahl Funny Prize 2011
Red House Children's Book Award 2012
Waterstones Children's Book Prize 2012 for Best Fiction for 5-12 Year Olds
Blue Peter Award for Best Story 2013
 Winner - The LOLLIES Best Laugh Out Loud Book for 9-13 2018 - Tom Gates Epic Adventures (Kind Of)

Runner-up:

 2004: Silver Award, Nestlé Smarties Book Prize (0–5 years), My Big Brother Boris
 2012: Finalist, Red House Children's Book Award and the Stockport Schools Book Award, The Three Horrid Pigs and the Big Friendly Wolf
2012: Shortlisted for the Specasvers National Book Awards Children's Book of the Year, Genius Ideas (Mostly)

The Brilliant World Of Tom Gates - TV SHOW  
BAFTA SCOTLAND 2021 Award - WINNER Best Entertainment 

Writers: Ben Ward, Liz Pichon.

BRITISH ANIMATION AWARDS: Children's Choice Award 

SHOE WARS 
WINNER 2022 (SPAIN) FESTILIJC3 Torre del Agua  Translation By Daniel Cortes Coronas

References

External links 
 
 
 Blog
 

1963 births
Writers from London
British children's book illustrators
British children's writers
British women children's writers
Living people
21st-century English writers
21st-century English women writers
Alumni of Camberwell College of Arts
Writers with dyslexia